Jinamoc Seaplane Base is a former World War II seaplane base on Jinamoc Island,  San Pedro Bay, Leyte Gulf, Philippines. Jinamoc Seaplane Base was part of the Leyte-Samar Naval Base.

History
Construction on the base commenced in December 1944 with grading for a seaplane ramp, a pontoon barge was then floated into position and submerged. In May 1945 construction was started on a more permanent  steel and concrete ramp. Facilities at the base included 75 Quonset huts for accommodation, a 200-bed dispensary, water supply and utilities. While construction was not completed until May 1945, the base began operation on 14 January 1945.

US Navy units based at the base included:
VP-25 6–25 February 1945
VP-33 1–16 March 1945
VP-43 June 1945 – June 1946
VPB-17 9 March-27 April 1945
VPB-20 8–26 February 1945

No. 42 Squadron RAAF maintained a detachment at Jinamoc from March to May 1945.

See also
Tacloban Airfield

References

Airfields of the United States Navy
Military installations closed in the 1940s
Seaplane bases
Military installations of the United States in the Philippines
Buildings and structures in Samar (province)
History of Samar (province)
Closed installations of the United States Navy